Frans Cornelis Adrianus van Anraat (born 9 August 1942 in Den Helder) is a Dutch war criminal and a businessman. He sold raw materials for the production of chemical weapons to Iraq during the reign of Saddam Hussein. In December 2005, a court in The Hague convicted him of complicity in war crimes for his role in selling chemical weapons to Saddam's government. He was given a 15-year sentence. In 2007, the appeal court sentenced Van Anraat to 17 years in prison.

Van Anraat is the only Dutchman ever to appear on the FBI's most wanted list.

Business in Iraq
In the 1970s, Van Anraat worked at engineering companies in Italy, Switzerland and Singapore that were building chemical plants in Iraq. Having learned about the trade in chemicals, he founded his own company, "FCA Contractor", based in Bissone, Switzerland. Starting in 1984, he supplied thousands of tons of chemicals to Iraq including the essential raw materials for producing mustard gas and nerve gas. Both gases were used during the Iran–Iraq War, between 1980 and 1988, as well as during the Halabja poison gas attack the military carried out on Iraqi Kurds, in 1988, which killed about 5,000 people and injured 10,000 more. The attack was part of the Al-Anfal campaign of the Iraqi regime against Kurds in the north of the country.

Arrest and trial
After Van Anraats arrest upon the request of the US in Italy in 1989, his offices in Switzerland and Italy were searched and documents were confiscated. Van Anraat was released pending his trial and fled to Iraq, where he lived for the next 14 years, was granted the Iraqi nationality and given an Arabic name. When Hussein's regime fell in 2003, Van Anraat returned to the Netherlands. He was arrested on 6 December 2004, for complicity in war crimes and genocide. On 23 December 2005, he was sentenced to 15 years in prison for complicity in war crimes, but the court decided that the charges of complicity in genocide could not be substantiated.

The court also ruled that the killing of thousands of Kurds in Iraq in the 1980s, was an act of genocide.  In the 1948 Geneva Convention, the definition of genocide is  "acts committed with the intent to destroy, in whole or in part, a national, ethnic, racial or religious group". The Dutch court said that it was considered "legally and convincingly proven that the Kurdish population meets the requirement under the Genocide Conventions as an ethnic group. The court has no other conclusion than that these attacks were committed with the intent to destroy the Kurdish population of Iraq."

Both the public prosecutor and Van Anraat appealed the verdict. In May 2007, the appeals court sentenced Van Anraat to 17 years in prison. The charge of complicity in multiple war crimes explains the extra two years, but he was not found guilty of complicity in genocide. In June 2007, the Dutch Supreme Court confirmed the sentence but reduced the imprisonment to 16 years and 6 months. Anraat was released from prison in 2015.

Informant for the Dutch secret service
Shortly after the arrest of Van Anraat, several Dutch newspapers reported that Van Anraat had been an informant for the Dutch secret service, the AIVD. According to the Dutch press, Van Anraat received protection from the AIVD and was placed in a safehouse of the Ministry of the Interior and Kingdom Relations, in Amsterdam.

References

External links
 Trial Watch: Frans Van Anraat

20th-century Dutch criminals
21st-century Dutch criminals
1942 births
Living people
Dutch businesspeople
People from Den Helder
Dutch people convicted of war crimes
Dutch people imprisoned abroad
Prisoners and detainees of Italy
Prisoners and detainees of the Netherlands
Iraqi chemical weapons program
Dutch expatriates in Iraq
Iraq–Netherlands relations